Surrender to Me may refer to multiple pieces of music, including:

 "Surrender to Me" (Ann Wilson and Robin Zander song)
 "Surrender to Me" (FireCityFunk song)
 "Surrender to Me", a song by Baker Knight
 "Surrender to Me", a song by Boston
 "Surrender to Me", a song by McGuinn, Clark & Hillman
 "Surrender to Me", a song by Samantha Cole